The Uttar Pradesh women's cricket team is an Indian domestic cricket team representing the Indian state of Uttar Pradesh. The team has represented the state in Women's Senior One Day Trophy (List A) and  Senior women's T20 league.

Honours
 Women's Senior One Day Trophy:
 Runners-up (1): 2012–13

References

Women's cricket teams in India
Cricket in Uttar Pradesh
Women in Uttar Pradesh